The 2020 Coppa Italia Final decided the winners of the 2019–20 Coppa Italia, the 73rd season of Italy's main football cup.

It was originally scheduled to be played on 13 May 2020, at the Stadio Olimpico in Rome. However, due to the COVID-19 pandemic in Italy, it was first postponed to 20 May, and then to 17 June. Following the second leg of both semi-finals, also delayed until 12 and 13 June 2020, the finalists were determined to be Napoli and Juventus. Napoli won the match 4–2 on penalties after a goalless draw.	

As the cup winners, Napoli automatically qualified to the group stage of the 2020–21 UEFA Europa League and to the 2020 Supercoppa Italiana against the champions of the 2019–20 Serie A, Juventus.

Background
Napoli appeared in the final for the 10th time, with a record of five wins and four losses in their first nine appearances. It was a record 19th appearance for Juventus in a Coppa Italia final, and fifth appearance in the last six years. Going into the final, Juventus had won in 13 of their 18 final appearances. The teams had met in the final only once in 2012, a match Napoli won 2–0.

Road to the final
Note: In all results below, the score of the finalist is given first (H: home; A: away).

Match

Details

{| width="100%"
|valign="top" width="40%"|

See also
 2019–20 Coppa Italia
 2020–21 UEFA Europa League
 2020 Supercoppa Italiana
 Juventus F.C.–S.S.C. Napoli rivalry

Notes

References 

Coppa Italia Finals
Coppa Italia Final
Coppa Italia Final 2020
Coppa Italia Final 2020
Coppa Italia Final
Coppa Italia Final 2020
Coppa Italia Final 2020
Coppa Italia Final 2020
Coppa Italia Final 2020
Coppa Italia Final 2020